is a former Japanese football player. He played for Japan national team.

Club career
Hasegawa was born in Uji on 11 February 1969. After graduating from Osaka University of Economics, he joined Japan Soccer League club Honda in 1991. In 1992, he moved to J1 League club Kashima Antlers. He mainly played as regular player in 1990s. In 2000, the club won all three major title in Japan; J1 League, J.League Cup and Emperor's Cup first time in J.League history. The club won the champions J1 League 4 times, J.League Cup 3 times and Emperor's Cup 2 times. He retired in July 2003.

National team career
On 15 February 1995, Hasegawa debuted for Japan national team against Australia. He was also selected Japan in 1996. He played 6 games for Japan until 1996.

Club statistics

National team statistics

References

External links

Japan National Football Team Database

1969 births
Living people
Osaka University of Economics alumni
Association football people from Kyoto Prefecture
Japanese footballers
Japan international footballers
Japan Soccer League players
J1 League players
Honda FC players
Kashima Antlers players
Association football forwards